The 1994 season of the American Professional Soccer League (APSL) was the fifth in the history of the league, which was the top level of club soccer in the United States from 1990 to 1995. It was planned to be contested by eight teams in the U.S. and Canada and took place between July 1 and October 15, partially overlapping with the 1994 FIFA World Cup. The Tampa Bay Rowdies folded and the Toronto Blizzard were replaced by the Toronto Rockets, who were formed from the North York Rockets of the Canadian Soccer League. Two expansion teams, the Houston Force and Seattle Sounders, were also added.

The Force postponed their first two matches and played against the Los Angeles Salsa before the APSL revoked their franchise on July 22, 1994. The league cited financial issues that the ownership group were unwilling to address. The season continued with 20 regular season matches for each team, including new fixtures to replace Houston's schedule, and a two-round playoffs for the top four teams. The playoffs semifinals were played in a best-of-three format, with a 30-minute third match following the second leg and a penalty shootout if necessary. The third match was held on the same day as the second leg due to budget constraints.

Regular season

Playoffs

Bracket

Semifinal 1

Semifinal 2

Final

MVP: Rudy Doliscat

Points leaders

Honors
 MVP: Paulinho
 Leading goal scorer: Paul Wright
 Leading goalkeeper: Marcus Hahnemann
 Rookie of the Year: Jason Dunn
 Coach of the Year: Alan Hinton
 First Team All League
 Goalkeeper: Marcus Hahnemann
 Defenders: Robin Fraser, Danny Pena, Neil Megson, Steve Trittschuh
 Midfielders: Paulinho, Dale Mitchell, Shawn Medved, Ted Eck
 Forwards: Chance Fry, Paul Wright
 Second Team All League
 Goalkeeper: Pat Harrington
 Defenders: Jeff Agoos, Billy Crook, James Dunn, Robert Lipp
 Midfielders: Nick Dasovic, Jason Farrell, David Hoggan, Dominic Kinnear
 Forwards: Jean Harbor, Jason Dunn

References

External links
 The Year in American Soccer - 1994
USA - A-League (American Professional Soccer League) (RSSSF)

APSL/A-League seasons
1
1994 in Canadian soccer